All Cats Are Grey is a 2014 Belgian coming-of-age drama film directed by Savina Dellicour and co-written by Dellicour and Matthieu de Braconier. All Cats Are Grey had its world premiere at the 32nd Turin Film Festival. It also screened as a special presentation during the 2015 Santa Barbara International Film Festival, where it won Best International Film. Critical response was generally strong and the film received nine nominations at the 6th Magritte Awards, including Best Film and Best Director for Dellicour.

Plot
Dorothy (Manon Capelle) is a 15-year-old girl who was raised in a well-off residential neighbourhood of Brussels. She does not feel comfortable with her daily life, partly because of the detached relationship with her mother (Anne Coesens). Dorothy finds music a pleasant form of escape and passes her days listening to The Cure and new music artists. By chance, she meets Paul (Bouli Lanners), a 43-year-old man who works as a detective and leads a solitary existence after his wife's death. Dorothy asks him for help in the search for her biological father and Paul agrees. A strong connection arises between them, but Dorothy doest not know that he is actually her biological father. Over the years, away from Dorothy, Paul has always lived with this secret. Now back in Brussels he has been watching her from afar, without ever daring to approach her.

Cast
 Manon Capelle as Dorothy
 Bouli Lanners as Paul 
 Anne Coesens as Christine
 Aisleen McLafferty
 Astrid Whettnall
 Vincent Lecuyer

Critical reception
Upon its screening at the Rome Film Festival, All Cats Are Grey was positively received with a standing ovation from the audience. On the review aggregator Cinebel, the film has received a weighted average score of 8.2 out of 10, based on 11 critics. Michaël Degré from L'Avenir felt that the film offers a smart reflection about fatherhood and family. Fernand Denis of La Libre Belgique called Dellicour's direction a "polished work" which displays a "sense of observation and a tone that mixes harmoniously humor and existential angst". He also regarded Lanners' acting as one of his finest performances.

Hugues Dayez from RTBF commented that Dellicour builds a real suspense drama in which she describes with "great accuracy" the social impact of two distant worlds: the modest and simple world of Paul, and the austere and hypocritical one of Christine. Louis Danvers from Le Vif wrote that the young Manon Capelle and Bouli Lanners form a "very convincing couple". He praised Dellicour's direction and Thomas Buelens' cinematography. The Canadian Film Institute described the film as "superbly written", filled with unexpected discoveries for characters and audience alike, and called Manon Capelle a revelation.

Accolades

References

External links 

2014 films
Belgian coming-of-age drama films
Belgian independent films
Films about dysfunctional families
Films set in Brussels
Films shot in Brussels
Magritte Award winners
2010s coming-of-age drama films
2014 independent films
2014 directorial debut films
2014 drama films
2010s French-language films
French-language Belgian films